South Charleston is a city in Kanawha County, West Virginia, United States. It is located to the west of Charleston. The population was 13,639 at the 2020 census. South Charleston was established in 1906, but not incorporated until 1917. The Criel Mound built circa 0 B.C. by the Adena culture is adjacent to the downtown business district.

It is home to the Charleston Ordnance Center, a former naval munitions factory established for use in World War I.

The city is serviced by Interstate 64, U.S. Route 60, U.S. Route 119, West Virginia Route 601 and West Virginia Route 214, and is adjacent to the Kanawha River. The city is serviced by the Kanawha Valley Regional Transportation Authority bus system. A general aviation airfield, Mallory Airport, is located off Chestnut Street, approximately two miles south of U.S. Route 60, with the nearest commercial aviation service being at Yeager Airport in Charleston.  South Charleston serves as the headquarters to the West Virginia Division of Natural Resources and the West Virginia State Police.

History
South Charleston was established in 1906, but not incorporated until 1917.

It is home to the Charleston Ordnance Center, a former naval munitions factory established for use in World War I. It employed over 11,000 workers and produced 130,000 gun barrels for U.S. warships.

Geography
South Charleston is located at  (38.352455, −81.712001).

Climate
The climate in this area is characterized by hot, humid summers and generally mild to cool winters.  According to the Köppen Climate Classification system, South Charleston has a humid subtropical climate, abbreviated "Cfa" on climate maps.

Demographics

The median income for a household in the city was $37,905, and the median income for a family was $50,528. Males had a median income of $39,036 versus $25,978 for females. The per capita income for the city was $24,928. About 9.7% of families and 12.1% of the population were below the poverty line, including 19.4% of those under age 18 and 9.8% of those age 65 or over.

2010 census
As of the census of 2010, there were 13,450 people, 6,283 households, and 3,675 families residing in the city. The racial makeup of the city was 86.9% White, 8.4% African American, 0.3% Native American, 1.1% Asian, 0.3% from other races, and 3.0% from two or more races. Hispanic or Latino of any race were 1.0% of the population.

There were 6,283 households, of which 26.1% had children under the age of 18 living with them, 39.6% were married couples living together, 15.5% had a female householder with no husband present, 3.4% had a male householder with no wife present, and 41.5% were non-families. 36.0% of all households were made up of individuals, and 13.4% had someone living alone who was 65 years of age or older. The average household size was 2.14 and the average family size was 2.77.

The median age in the city was 42.3 years. 20.9% of residents were under the age of 18; 6.5% were between the ages of 18 and 24; 25.7% were from 25 to 44; 29.5% were from 45 to 64; and 17.6% were 65 years of age or older. The gender makeup of the city was 45.7% male and 54.3% female.

Economy
In South Charleston are the headquarters of International Industries, the parent company of a group of subsidiaries founded in 1947 by James H. "Buck" Harless, based primarily in natural resources such as coal and timber, but which also include the manufacturing, hotel and real estate industries.

Education
There are six elementary schools in South Charleston: Montrose Elementary, Ruthlawn Elementary, Richmond Elementary, Alum Creek Elementary, Bridgeview Elementary, and Weberwood Elementary. The main middle school is South Charleston Middle School (SCMS), which is located on 3rd Ave. SCMS houses grades 6–8. South Charleston High School (SCHS) is one of eight high schools in Kanawha County. SCHS is located on Eagle Way and houses grades 9–12. There are also two colleges located in the city. A South Charleston campus for BridgeValley Community and Technical College is located at the former Dow Chemical research facility and the Marshall University – South Charleston Campus is a branch of Marshall University.

Arts and culture
South Charleston attractions include Criel Mound (also known as the South Charleston Adena Burial Mound), and the South Charleston Museum.  The South Charleston Museum is located in the historic LaBelle Theater on D Street, and features a West Virginia Film Series, Open Mic Night, exhibitions, and other events.

The city is also home to a community center, an ice arena, Little Creek Park, Little Creek Country Club and Joplin Park.
The Interpretive Center is located at 313 D street and features the Appalachian trail, the Mound, Indian artifacts, arrowheads, chemical history and artifacts, and a Belgium display depicting the first business in South Charleston also Blenko birthday pieces donated by Pearl Watson.

Notable people

 Former NFL player Carl Lee was also born and raised in South Charleston
 Country singer-songwriter Kathy Mattea was born in the city's Thomas Memorial Hospital to parents who lived in nearby Cross Lanes, where she grew up
 Thomas Memorial Hospital is named after Herbert J. Thomas, Jr., a World War II Medal of Honor recipient who was raised in South Charleston
 Breece D'J Pancake, short-story writer, was born in South Charleston
 Alex Hawkins, SCHS graduate, NFL player and broadcaster, "Captain Who" author
 Larry Combs, musician, inducted into the Music Hall of Fame, Chicago symphony SCHS class of 1957

See also
Rock Lake Pool (1942–1985)

References

External links

 City of South Charleston
 South Charleston Convention & Visitors Bureau 

 
Cities in West Virginia
Cities in Kanawha County, West Virginia
Populated places on the Kanawha River
Charleston, West Virginia metropolitan area